Chicago Midway International Airport , typically referred to as Midway Airport, Chicago Midway, or simply Midway, is a major commercial airport on the Southwest side of Chicago, Illinois, located approximately 12 miles (19 km) from the Loop business district. Established in 1927, Midway served as Chicago's primary airport until the opening of O'Hare International Airport in 1955. Today, Midway is one of the busiest airports in the nation and the second-busiest airport both in the Chicago metropolitan area and the state of Illinois, serving 20,844,860 passengers in 2019.

Midway is a base for Southwest Airlines, which carries over 95% of the passengers at the airport. The airport's current name is in honor of the Battle of Midway. The now-defunct Midway Airlines that once serviced the airport took its name from the airport. The airfield is located in a square mile bounded by 55th and 63rd Streets, and Central and Cicero Avenues. The current terminal complex was completed in 2001. The terminal bridges Cicero Avenue and contains 43 gates with facilities for international passengers. The CTA rapid transit Orange Line provides transit to Downtown Chicago, where it connects with other subway/elevated rapid transit lines.

History

Early history (1923–1962)
Originally named Chicago Air Park, Midway Airport was built on a  plot in 1923 with one cinder runway mainly for airmail flights. In 1926 the city leased the airport and named it Chicago Municipal Airport on December 12, 1927. By 1928, the airport had twelve hangars and four runways, lit for night operations.

A major fire early on June 25, 1930 destroyed two hangars and 27 aircraft, "12 of them tri-motor passenger planes." The loss was estimated at more than two million dollars. The hangars destroyed were belonged to the Universal Air Lines, Inc. and the Grey Goose Airlines, the latter under lease to Stout Air Lines. The fire followed an explosion of undetermined cause in the Universal hangar.

In 1931 a new passenger terminal opened at 62nd St; the following year the airport claimed to be the "World's Busiest" with over 100,846 passengers on 60,947 flights. (The July 1932 Official Aviation Guide (OAG) shows 206 scheduled airline departures a week.)

More construction was funded in part by $1 million from the Works Progress Administration; the airport expanded to fill the square mile in 1938–41 after a court ordered the Chicago and Western Indiana Railroad to reroute tracks that had crossed the square along the northern edge of the older field.

The March 1939 OAG shows 47 weekday departures: 13 on United, 13 American, 9 TWA, 4 Northwest, and two each on Eastern, Braniff, Pennsylvania Central, and C&S. New York's airport (Newark, then LaGuardia by the end of 1939) was then the busiest airline airport in the United States, but Midway passed LaGuardia in 1948 and kept the title until 1960. The record-breaking 1945 Japan–Washington flight of B-29s refueled at the airport on their way to Washington, DC.

In July 1949, the airport was renamed after the Battle of Midway. That year, Midway saw 3.2 million passengers; passengers peaked at 10 million in 1959. The diagram on the January 1951 C&GS approach chart shows four parallel pairs of runways, all 4240 ft or less except for 5730-ft runway 13R (current runway 13C) and 5230-ft runway 4R.

The April 1957 OAG shows 414 weekday fixed-wing departures from Midway: 83 American, 83 United, 56 TWA, 40 Capital, 35 North Central, 28 Delta, 27 Eastern, 22 Northwest, 19 Ozark, 11 Braniff, 5 Trans-Canada, and 5 Lake Central. Air France, Lufthansa, and REAL (of Brazil) had a few flights per week. Midway was running out of room and in any case could not handle the 707 and DC-8 jets that appeared in 1959; every Chicago jet flight had to use O'Hare, which had opened to the airlines in 1955. Electras and Viscounts could have continued to fly out of Midway, but O'Hare's new terminal opened in 1962, allowing airlines to consolidate their flights. From July 1962 until United returned in July 1964, Midway's only scheduled airline was Chicago Helicopter. In August 1966, a total of four fixed-wing arrivals were scheduled, all United 727s (United was alone at Midway until early 1968).

Post-O'Hare reconstruction (1963–1993)
By 1967 reconstruction began at the airport, adding three new concourses with 28 gates and three ticket counters, and in 1968 the city invested $10 million in renovation funds. (For a few months during the 1967 renovation Midway had no scheduled airline flights.) The funds partly supported construction of the Stevenson Expressway, and Midway saw the return of major airlines that year, with 1,663,074 passengers on smaller-capacity, shorter range twin-jet and trijet airliners such as the McDonnell Douglas DC-9, BAC One-Eleven, Boeing 727, and Boeing 737 that could use Midway's runways, which the Boeing 707 and Douglas DC-8 could not. In May 1968 there were 22 scheduled departures: six United 727s to MSP, DCA and LGA, 12 Northwest 727s to MSP and CLE, one Delta DC-9 to STL and three Ozark FH227s.

The December 1970 OAG shows 86 weekday arrivals (77 jet) on 13 fixed-wing airlines from 31 airports, but the August 1974 shows 14 arrivals (all jet) on four airlines, and in 1976–79 Midway had only the two or three Delta DC-9s from St Louis. Midway Airlines arrived on October 31, 1979, with DC-9 nonstops to Kansas City, Detroit and Cleveland Lakefront; they expanded greatly in the 1980s. Their September 1989 timetable shows 117 weekday departures to 29 cities, plus 108 departures on their commuter affiliates to 22 more cities. Midway ceased flying in 1991 due to financial challenges.

In 1982, the city of Chicago purchased Midway Airport from the Chicago Board of Education for $16 million. Three years later, Southwest Airlines began operations at Midway. Midway was a focus city for Vanguard Airlines from 1997 to 2000.

The Chicago Transit Authority displaced the Carlton Midway Inn to open a new CTA terminal at the airport on October 31, 1993, for the new Chicago 'L' Orange Line that connected Midway to the Loop. Midway Airport is the end of the line, which crosses the southwest part of the city before circling around the Loop. Unlike the CTA Blue Line, which runs 24 hours a day, every day, the Orange Line runs from about 4:00 am to 1:00 am, just shy of 24 hours, at an average of 8-minute intervals. During overnight periods, the N62 Archer bus is available as an alternative. Once the train departs, the trip from Midway to the Loop takes about 25 minutes.

Years of ATA (1994–2008)
In 1996, after failing to get his Lake Calumet Airport and having received harsh criticism for the idea of turning the airport into an industrial park, Chicago Mayor Richard M. Daley announced the Midway Airport Terminal Development Program, which was launched the following year. At the time, it was the largest public works project in the state. The Midway Airport parking garage opened in 1999, bringing covered parking to the airport for the first time. The garage is connected to the Midway terminal building for convenient access to ticket counters and baggage claim areas.

Continuing with the expansion project, a pedestrian bridge over Cicero Avenue was built in 2000, connecting the new terminal to the new concourses. In 2001 the new  Midway Airport terminal building opened, with larger ticket counters, spacious baggage claim areas, traveler information, and a short walking distance to gates. A  food court opened with Chicago-style food and retail options.

The expansion project culminated with a short lived period of great airline diversity at Midway as Vanguard Airlines, National Airlines and AirTran Airways all expanded their services to the airport.

ATA Airlines (ATA) took over Chicago Express Airlines, also known as ATA Connection, whose primary hub was at Midway.
Chicago Express served as a regional airline connecting to airports around the Great Lakes regions.

Following the September 11 attacks, which resulted in a drop in passenger service, along with other problems for the airline industry, both Vanguard and National ceased operations at Midway and became defunct in 2002, with MetroJet being dissolved and refolded into US Airways' main line in late 2001.

In 2002 Midway welcomed the return of international service after a 40-year absence with the opening of the new Federal Inspection Service facility in Concourse A.

In June 2004, Mayor Daley and airline officials celebrated the completion of the Terminal Development Program. The project, designed by HNTB resulted in the addition of 14 gates (from 29 to 43). A new 6,300-space economy parking garage, including a new bridge and roadway for buses shuttling passengers to and from the terminal, opened in December 2005.

Simultaneous to Midway's expansion, ATA Airlines began rapid expansion at Midway in the early 2000s (decade), and was the airport's dominant carrier prior to 2004, using 14 of the 17 gates in Concourse A. However, after the airline declared bankruptcy in October 2004, scheduled service from Midway significantly decreased.

For over 16 years, Midway had been the main hub for Indianapolis-based ATA, but the airline shut down on June 7, 2008. Earlier, the airline filed for bankruptcy in April 2008; on April 3, 2008, ATA Airlines discontinued all operations.

In November 2008, Porter Airlines, which flies between Midway and Billy Bishop Toronto City Airport, was the only international route served from Chicago–Midway after ATA Airlines, which had flights to Mexico, ceased operations in April that year. On December 13, 2010, a second carrier, Volaris, began flights between Guadalajara and Midway.

Starting in early 2009, a construction project added a new walkway and food court to Concourse A. The project also connected gates A4A and A4B to the main A concourse. Expansions were completed in the spring of 2010.

Privatization attempts
Chicago has considered privatizing the airport, but the deals fell through in 2009 and 2013.

On April 20, 2009, a $2.5 billion deal to privatize the airport via a 99-year lease fell through when the consortium could not put together financing. The city would have kept $125 million in the down payment. The consortium operating under the name of Midway Investment and Development Company LLC consisted of Vancouver Airport Services, Citi Infrastructure Investors, and Boston's John Hancock Life Insurance. It was awarded the contract in October 2008 by the City Council, which voted 49–0 to approve it. The consortium would have operated the airport and collected airport parking, concession, and passenger facility charges. However, Chicago would have continued to provide fire and police services. In 2010 a new slogan emerged, calling the airport "The busiest square mile in the world".

In September 2013, Mayor Rahm Emanuel terminated new negotiations to privatize the airport, noting that the process was no longer competitive after one of the two finalists had backed out. The one remaining was Great Lakes Airport Alliance – a partnership of Macquarie Infrastructure and Real Assets and Ferrovial. Macquarie was one of the investors in the Chicago Skyway. The group that had backed out was a group that included the Australia-based Industry Funds Management and Manchester Airports Group. The Great Lakes proposal had been valued at $2 billion and would have involved a 40-year lease.

Modernization program 
Construction began in 2018 on expansions of the security checkpoint and main parking garage. The bridge spanning Cicero Ave is being widened from 50 feet to over 400 feet, allowing up to 17 security lanes and a streamlined queue. As the current terminal opened just a few months prior to the September 11th attacks, the security area was quickly rendered too small for the new screening measures and subsequently was forced to expand inward, taking away from space in the concourses. Space that is reclaimed by moving security outward into the bridge will be redeveloped with an expansion of the central food court. The main parking garage is being extended eastward over the CTA L tracks to add 1,500 spaces and streamline the entrance way. In addition to the redeveloped central food court, new concession options will open in phases including a food court in Concourse A utilizing previously unused space built during the 2010 rebuild of the Gate A4A/B connecting walkway. The program is the largest capital improvements project at the airport since the 2001 terminal redevelopment and is scheduled to be completed in the winter of 2019–2020.

Facilities

All terminals and hangars were on the square periphery. By the late 1970s, the shorter north–south and east–west runway pairs had been closed, though some were converted to taxiways. The other four runways remain in use, all strengthened and enhanced, but about the same lengths as always. A short runway (13R/31L) for light aircraft was added in 1989.

Chicago Midway International Airport covers just over one square mile and has five runways:

 13C/31C: , air carrier runway, ILS-equipped
 4R/22L: , air carrier runway, ILS-equipped
 4L/22R: , general aviation and air taxi
 13L/31R: , general aviation and air taxi.
 13R/31L: , light aircraft only.

Midway is surrounded by buildings and other development, so the landing thresholds of the runways are displaced to provide obstacle clearance. The FAA and the airlines ensure safety by adhering to calculated load limits and various weather minimums. The largest aircraft normally seen at Midway is the Boeing 757. Normally, commercial planes only take off from and land on runways 4R/22L and 13C/31C. The other runways are used by smaller aircraft and, per the US FAA Chart Supplement are restricted from use by large commercial aircraft except in emergency.

Terminal
Midway has 43 aircraft gates on three concourses.

Concourse A has 17 gates.
Concourse B has 23 gates. 
Concourse C has 3 gates.

Airlines and destinations

Passenger

Statistics

Top destinations

Airline market share

Airport traffic

Accidents and incidents
On December 8, 1972, United Airlines Flight 553, a Boeing 737-200, crashed into a residential area outside Midway during landing. The crash of the 737-200 killed 43 of the 61 on board, and two on the ground. One of the victims on the plane was Dorothy Hunt, the wife of Watergate conspirator E. Howard Hunt. She was carrying $10,000 in cash. James McCord alleged that she supplied the Watergate defendants with money for legal expenses.

Exactly 33 years later, on December 8, 2005, Southwest Airlines Flight 1248, a Boeing 737-700 inbound from Baltimore–Washington International Airport in Baltimore, Maryland, slid off the runway while attempting to land at the airport in a heavy snow storm. The airplane broke through the barrier fence of the airport, and came to rest at the intersection of 55th Street and Central Avenue bordering the airport at its northwest corner. A 6-year-old boy was killed as a passenger in a vehicle that was struck by the plane after it skidded into the street.

Source: Civil Aeronautics Board archives, NTSB records.

Note: Prior to 1941, the runways did not have numerical designations. The runway now designated 13C/31C was designated 13R/31L from 1941 until 1989, when a new Runway 13R/31L was built. Runways 27L, 27R, 36L and 36R were closed by 1973.

See also

 Gary/Chicago International Airport
 Chicago Rockford International Airport
 Meigs Field
 Illinois World War II Army Airfields
 2014 air traffic control facility fire

References

External links

Midway: Terminal and Concourse Maps
TWA Crash of 1959
1972 Crash Summary
Early Midway images
Airport diagram for 1959

 
Airports in Cook County, Illinois
Airfields of the United States Army Air Forces in Illinois
Buildings and structures in Chicago
Historic American Buildings Survey in Chicago
Airfields of the United States Army Air Forces Air Transport Command in North America
Works Progress Administration in Illinois
Transportation in Chicago
Airports established in 1927
1927 establishments in Illinois